Iris Silva Tang Sing (born August 21, 1990) is a taekwondo competitor from Brazil. She won bronze medals at the world championships and at the Pan American Games in 2015, and qualified for the 2016 Summer Olympics in the 49 kg division.

References

External links

 

1990 births
Living people
Brazilian female taekwondo practitioners
Taekwondo practitioners at the 2015 Pan American Games
Pan American Games bronze medalists for Brazil
Taekwondo practitioners at the 2016 Summer Olympics
Olympic taekwondo practitioners of Brazil
Pan American Games medalists in taekwondo
South American Games bronze medalists for Brazil
South American Games medalists in taekwondo
Competitors at the 2014 South American Games
World Taekwondo Championships medalists
Medalists at the 2015 Pan American Games
21st-century Brazilian women